South Sudan–Turkey relations are the foreign relations between South Sudan and Turkey. Turkey has an embassy in Juba, while South Sudan has an embassy in Ankara.

History 
Turkey was one of the first countries to recognize the independence of South Sudan from Sudan in 2011. Soon after that, the Turkish consulate general in Juba was upgraded to embassy status.

In 2020, the Turkish news agency Anadolu Agency stated that the Turkish Cooperation and Coordination Agency (TIKA) had donated donates equipment, materials for vocational training program for inmates. The donated equipment included 100 welding rods, 240 grinding discs, 280 cutting discs, welding goggles, hammers and sheet metal. The same year, TIKA donated about 250 fishing kits to over 150 fishermen in Juba.

Economic Relations 
 Trade volume between the two countries was 2.7 million USD in 2018. The trade volume grew to 3.2 million USD in 2019.

See also 

 Foreign relations of South Sudan
 Foreign relations of Turkey

References 

South Sudan–Turkey relations